Len Barwell was an association football player who represented New Zealand at international level.

Barwell made a single appearance in an official international for the All Whites in a 3–1 win over Australia on 8 July 1922

References

External links
 

Year of birth missing
New Zealand association footballers
New Zealand international footballers
Year of death missing
Association football forwards